Crystal Frasier is an American artist and game designer known for her work on the Pathfinder Roleplaying Game. She was also the author of the webcomic, Venus Envy, with a trans woman as a protagonist, which ran from 2001 to 2014. She is a trans woman and is intersex.

Early life
In her early life, Frasier grew up in small town in Florida, spending time watching television, reading, and playing with her Ninja Turtles or stuffed animals. In elementary school, she started writing stories and drawing comics, continuing this in junior high school where she drew comics for the school's newspaper. In high school, she wrote a Sailor Moon fan fiction, began running a gaming blog, and her first paid article was in a gaming magazine. She later graduated from the Art Institute of Seattle and the New College of Florida.

Career
In December 2001, she started the webcomic Venus Envy under the name "Erin Lindsey."

Frasier worked in the art and layout department of Paizo Inc. from 2009 to 2014. In 2015 she rejoined the company as a game developer. In 2016 she also became the Line Developer for Mutants and Masterminds, the flagship RPG game from Green Ronin Publishing. Her adventure design credits include The Harrowing and In Hell's Bright Shadow. She also created Shardra Geltl, the Pathfinder Roleplaying Game's first transgender iconic character. She also worked on comic books based on Pathfinder, like the Spiral of Bones and Dynamite series.

In June 2015, she and Jenn Dolari also received notice for the creation of a meme featuring transgender people based on the Vanity Fair cover featuring Caitlyn Jenner.

In 2016, Frasier was announced as a Gen Con Industry Insider Featured Presenter. In 2018, she left the Paizo game developing team to "focus on her freelancing career."

In January 2021 Oni-Lion Forge stated that in August 2021, a graphic novel, Cheer Up!, written by Frasier and illustrated by Val Wise, would be release The graphic novel was described by Barnes & Noble as a "sweet, queer teen romance perfect for fans of Fence and Check Please!."

In February 2021, it was announced that she was one of the writers for the Love Is a Battlefield special by DC Comics, working with Juan Gedeon on a story where Wonder Woman and Steve Trevor have a "date night that inevitably takes a superheroic turn." In March 2021, she was noted as a co-writer of a comic series titled Gamma Flight for Marvel Comics with Al Ewing. Lan Medina would be the illustrator. Frasier had previously worked for Marvel in 2020 on a comic about The Immortal Hulk.  She is one of the authors of the upcoming Dungeons & Dragons sourcebook Van Richten's Guide to Ravenloft (2021).

Personal life
Frasier came out as a trans woman while working for Paizo, after going "stealth" following her transition, as she had no community to connect with, and wanted to help other trans people at that point. In November 2020, she tweeted that she was also intersex.

References

External links
Twitter account
Official website
 Writings for Know Direction Podcast

21st-century LGBT people
American comics writers
DC Comics people
Intersex women
LGBT comics creators
Living people
Marvel Comics people
Marvel Comics writers
Role-playing game artists
Role-playing game designers
Transgender women
Transgender writers
Year of birth missing (living people)